Tom McCready may refer to:
 Tom McCready (footballer, born 1943)
 Tom McCready (footballer, born 1991)